Tüfekçi (literally "riflemen or gunsmith" in Turkish language)  might refer to:

Places
 Tüfekçi, Dernekpazarı, a village in Trabzon Province, Turkey
 Tüfekçi, Daday, a village in Kastamonu Province, Turkey

People
 Bülent Tüfenkci (born 1966), Turkish politician
 Elias Toufexis (born 1975), Canadian actor
 İlyas Tüfekçi (born 1960), Turkish retired footballer
 Nida Tüfekçi (1929–1993), Turkish folk singer
 Zeynep Tufekci, Turkish academic

Other uses
 Tüfekçi (Ottoman soldier), Ottoman army riflemen (like the Spanish tercios)

Turkish-language surnames